The 2008 Campeonato Ecuatoriano de Fútbol de la Serie A (known as the 2008 Copa Pílsener Serie A for sponsorship reasons) was the 50th season of the Ecuadorian Serie A, Ecuador's premier football league. The three-stage season ran from February 8 and December 7.

Deportivo Quito became the league champion on December 3 by defeating Macará 2-1 in Latacunga. It is Deportivo Quito's 3rd title, and first in 40 years.

Format
The format for 2008 was new, but similar to the 2007 Serie A. The season was composed of three stages:

The format for the First Stage remained the same. The twelve teams competed against each other in a double round-robin format playing each opponent once at home and once away. The top-four teams at the end of the stage qualified to the Liguilla Final. The top-three teams earned bonus points for the Liguilla Final (3, 2, & 1 point[s] respectively) The top-team of the stage qualified to the last Ecuadorian spot in the 2008 Copa Sudamericana.

The format for the Second Stage changed. The twelve teams were divided into two groups of six, where they played within their groups in a double round-robin tournament. The winner of the each group qualified to the final two spots in the Liguilla Final. If a team who has already qualified for the Liguilla Final manages to qualify again by winning their group, the last spots for the Liguilla Final went to the highest positioned team(s) in the Aggregate Table who have not already qualified. The top-team of each group received one bonus point for the Liguilla Final (if a team who earned bonus points from the First Stage finishes last in their group, they will lose their bonus points for the Liguilla Final). At the end of this stage, the two teams with the fewest points in the aggregate table were relegated to the Serie B for the 2009 season.

The format for the Liguilla Final remained the same. The six qualified team competed in a double round-robin tournament. The winner of this stage was crowned the champion of the Copa Pílsener Serie A. The champion will qualified to the 2009 Copa Libertadores Second Stage, while the runner-up and third-place finisher qualify to the First Stage (this slight change from other years is due to the fact that the defending Copa Libertadores champion is an Ecuadorian team).

Teams
The number of teams for the Serie A expanded this season from 10 to 12. Imbabura was the only team relegated at the end of the 2007 season by accumulating the fewest points in the aggregate table. Universidad Católica, ESPOLI, and Técnico Universitario were promoted as 2007 Serie B winner, runner-up, and third-place finisher, respectively. All the new teams have previously played in the Serie A.

First stage
The first stage ran from February 8 to July 13.

Standings

Results

Second stage
The second stage was played between July 19, 2008, and September 27, 2008.

Group A

Standings

Results

Group B

Standings

Results

Aggregate table

Liguilla Final
The Liguilla Final was played between October 19, 2008 and December 7, 2008. The top team qualifies directly to the 2009 Copa Libertadores Second Stage, with the runner-up and third-place finisher qualifying to the First Stage (LDU Quito already has a berth into the Second Stage of the 2009 Copa Libertadores as the defending tournament champion).

Top-ten goalscorers
 
Last updated: December 6, 2008

See also
 Serie A de Ecuador
 2008 Copa Libertadores
 2008 Copa Sudamericana
 2008 in Ecuadorian football
 Federación Ecuatoriana de Fútbol

References

External links
Official website 
Ecuadorian football news

2008
Ecu
Football